The 1868 Florida gubernatorial election was held on May 4, 1868. Republican nominee Harrison Reed defeated the Democratic nominee George W. Scott in a landslide.

General election

Candidates 
 Harrison Reed, U.S. Postal Agent in Florida (Republican)
 George W. Scott, former Confederate Lieutenant Colonel (Democratic)
 Samuel Walker, former Monroe County prosecutor (Radical Republican)

Results

References 

1868 Florida elections
Florida
Florida gubernatorial elections